The 1949 Central Michigan Chippewas football team represented Central Michigan College of Education, later renamed Central Michigan University, as an independent during the 1949 college football season.  In their third and final season under head coach Lyle Bennett, the Chippewas compiled a 3–4 record and were outscored by their opponents by a combined total of 109 to 106.

On January 20, 1950, Bennett resigned as the school's head football coach. In three years as head coach from 1947 to 1949, Bennett compiled a record of 8–15–1. He stayed on at Central Michigan as the track coach and a trainer.

Schedule

References

Central Michigan
Central Michigan Chippewas football seasons
Central Michigan Chippewas football